Long Live Rock 'n' Roll is the third studio album by the British hard rock band Rainbow, released in 1978 and the last to feature original lead vocalist Ronnie James Dio.

Background
Recording of the album commenced in April 1977 at a studio in Château d'Hérouville, France, featuring Ritchie Blackmore, Ronnie James Dio and Cozy Powell. Keyboards were initially played on a session basis by former Rainbow member Tony Carey, while bass parts were started by Mark Clarke. Clarke was soon dismissed, however, and the bass parts were recorded by Blackmore himself. By July 1977 seven tracks that ended on the album were in demo form. Recording was suspended while the band recruited Bob Daisley and David Stone and thereafter commenced extensive touring of Europe in the summer and fall of 1977. A return to the Château d'Hérouville studio in December saw the band finish the album and also yielded a final track, "Gates of Babylon".

Although Daisley and Stone are listed on the album credits for their contributions, they joined the band partway through the recording sessions and only appear on three and four songs, respectively. Stone wrote parts of "Gates of Babylon", the middle 8 section during the guitar solo.  He was paid for the work, but not credited on the album.

"Kill the King" was already a staple part of the tour setlists, opening Rainbow concerts since mid-1976. It first appeared on the live album On Stage in 1977. In the 1977–78 concerts the title track and "Kill the King" were the only songs performed, although "L.A. Connection" did get a few airings on the US tour before being dropped from the set. From 2004 to his death in 2010, Dio's solo shows featured a live version of "Kill the King", "Gates of Babylon", and the title track.

Artwork
The original vinyl release was in a gatefold-sleeve cover illustrated by Debbie Hall, with a lyric-sheet insert. The crowd picture is actually from a Rush concert, with the wording on the banner the fans were holding replaced by the Rainbow album title and the visible Rush T-shirts airbrushed to black.

Release and reception

Geoff Ginsberg of AllMusic wrote that Long Live Rock 'n' Roll "would turn out to be the last great album Rainbow would ever make, although they did enjoy a great deal of chart success in the post-Dio era."

The album, among other Rainbow releases, is often cited as a strong influence on formation of the power metal genre, especially on its fantasy-themed lyrics and aesthetics.

Reissues
Long Live Rock 'n' Roll was remastered on CD for the US market in April 1999, with the European version following later. The US version had a matte booklet/insert, which matched the original vinyl sleeve for all markets, whereas the European issue was the standard glossy type.
Long Live Rock 'n' Roll Story, an album and a book about the making of the LP was released in June 2009 in the "Rock Landmarks" series. The inlay story was written by Jerry Bloom, author of Black Knight, a Ritchie Blackmore's biography.
On 12 April 2012 a picture disc album version of Long Live Rock 'n' Roll was released in the US as part of Record Store Day 2012.
A deluxe edition version was released on 13 November in Europe, featuring rough mixes of the album tracks from July 1977, with the exception of "Gates of Babylon" which was written later.

Track listing
All songs written by Ritchie Blackmore and Ronnie James Dio except where noted. All lyrics by Dio.

2012 Deluxe Edition
Disc one contains the original album with no bonus tracks

 Track 7 "Rainbow Eyes" is an early version. Tracks 10–14 are prerecorded with live vocal by Dio.

Personnel
Rainbow
Ronnie James Dio – lead vocals
Ritchie Blackmore – guitars, bass on tracks 1–3, 6 (also bass on rough mix tracks 1–6, 2012 Deluxe Edition)
Cozy Powell – drums, percussion
Bob Daisley – bass on "Gates of Babylon", "Kill the King", and "Sensitive to Light"
David Stone – keyboards on "Gates of Babylon", "Kill the King", "The Shed". Piano outro on "L.A. Connection"
Tony Carey – keyboards on "Long Live Rock 'n' Roll," "Lady of the Lake" and "Rainbow Eyes"

Additional musicians
Bavarian String Ensemble conducted by Rainer Pietsch on "Gates of Babylon"
Ferenc Kiss, Nico Nicolic – violins on "Rainbow Eyes"
Ottmar Machan – viola on "Rainbow Eyes"
Karl Heinz Feit – cello on "Rainbow Eyes"
Rudi Risavy – flute on "Rainbow Eyes"

Production
Martin Birch – producer and engineer
Max Hecker – classical instruments recording engineer 
Bruce Payne – direction
Recorded at The Strawberry Studio at Château d'Hérouville, France, May–July and December 1977

Singles
 1978 – "Long Live Rock 'n' Roll / Sensitive to Light"
 1978 – "L.A. Connection / Lady of the Lake"
These two singles were also re-released in the UK in July 1981. "Long Live Rock 'n' Roll" was also used for many years as a jingle by the British radio DJ Alan Freeman.

Charts 
 

Album

Singles

Certifications

Accolades

References

1978 albums
Rainbow (rock band) albums
Albums produced by Martin Birch
Polydor Records albums